Grafton is a hamlet in Shropshire, England. Its name probably refers to a coppiced wood.

It is situated in the parish of Pimhill, to the northwest of Shrewsbury. The River Perry flows by to the north, and on the other side is the small village of Yeaton.

References

External links

Hamlets in Shropshire